The following are the national records in athletics in Bosnia and Herzegovina maintained by the Athletic Federation of Bosnia and Herzegovina (ASBIH).

Outdoor

Key to tables:

h = hand timing

A = affected by altitude

Men

Women

Indoor

Men

Women

See also
 Bosnia and Herzegovina at the World Championships in Athletics

References
General
World Athletics Statistic Handbook 2022: National Outdoor Records
World Athletics Statistic Handbook 2022: National Indoor Records
Specific

External links
ASBIH web site

Bosnian and Herzegovinian
Athletics
Records
Athletics